The Bonesetter's Daughter is an opera in a prologue and two acts by Stewart Wallace to a libretto by
Amy Tan based on her novel of the same name. It premiered on 13 September 2008 at the War Memorial Opera House of San Francisco Opera, which commissioned the work.

Roles

Plot

The Bonesetter's Daughter traces a Chinese-American woman's search for her own voice and identity as she grapples with her elderly mother's apparent dementia, her husband's ambivalent commitment, and her teen stepdaughters' hurtful self-absorption. Guided by a ghost of uncertain identity, she travels into the past and lives out portions of her mother's tragic youth, gaining insight, forgiveness, and strength.

The opera is set both in 1997 San Francisco, and in China and Hong Kong around the outbreak of World War II.

Shifting times and locales are linked by a recurring trio of women: American-born Ruth, a professional ghostwriter who scarcely speaks up for herself; her mother, LuLing, who appears both as a querulous old woman and as a selfish adolescent; and LuLing's childhood caretaker known as Precious Auntie, who appears both as a ghost and as the fiery young mother she once was.

Scenes
Prologue — Dragon Dance – A timeless void
Act 1, scene 1 – Fountain Court Restaurant, San Francisco, 1997
Act 1, scene 2 – Immortal Heart, a village outside Beijing, 1930s
Act 2, scene 1 – Hong Kong Harbor, 1940s
Act 2, scene 2 – A hospital room, San Francisco, 1997

For further details, see The Bonesetter's Daughter.

Analysis
The score folds authentic Chinese musical expression into an essentially Western idiom, just as the libretto incorporates Chinese themes—such as the importance of family, and the power of ghosts and lucky charms—within an American framework. That framework includes many popular references, including a wry jab at "Medicare-approved" nursing homes and reference to Ruth's profession as a ghostwriter, which her immigrant mother misconstrues literally to mean a transcriptionist for ghosts. Notably, the infamous O. J. Simpson murder trial of 1995 becomes the vehicle by which elderly LuLing remembers and narrates traumatic events from her adolescence in China, which are revealed as the crux of her conflicts with her daughter.

References

 (review )
 (review )
Stewart Wallace: The Bonesetter's Daughter

2008 operas
English-language operas
Operas
Operas set in the United States
Operas by Stewart Wallace
Operas set in China
Operas based on novels
Opera world premieres at San Francisco Opera